Mesolicaphrium is a genus of extinct litoptern from the late middle Miocene of southern Colombia. It was named in 2020 by Andrew McGrath and colleagues, for the species previously classified as Prolicaphrium sanalfonensis from the La Victoria and Villavieja Formations of the Honda Group, Colombia. The type species is M. sanalfonense, known from the jaw symphysis and two right mandibular rami, and teeth. Mesolicaphrium is derived from the similarity to the names Prolicaphrium and Neolicaphrium, and being in between both taxa in age. The taxon was recovered in a phylogenetic analysis as the sister taxon of Diplasiotherium, closely related to Olisanophus.

References

Proterotheriids
Miocene mammals of South America
Laventan
Neogene Colombia
Fossils of Colombia
Honda Group, Colombia
Prehistoric placental genera
Fossil taxa described in 2020